Kanher Dam, is an earthfill and gravity dam on Wenna river near Satara in state of Maharashtra in India.

Specifications

Purpose
 Irrigation
 Hydroelectricity

See also
 Dams in Maharashtra
 List of reservoirs and dams in India

References

Dams in Satara district
Dams completed in 1986
1986 establishments in Maharashtra